The Jervis Bay Territory Acceptance Act 1915 is an Act of the Parliament of Australia which followed the New South Wales Seat of Government Surrender Act 1915. The Act created the Territory of Jervis Bay, subject to the laws of the Federal Capital Territory (FCT). While the Act's use of the language of "annexed" is sometimes interpreted as implying that the Jervis Bay Territory was to form part of the Federal Capital Territory, the accepted legal position is that it has been a legally distinct territory from its creation, despite being subject to FCT/ACT law and (prior to ACT self-government in 1988) being administratively treated as part of the FCT/ACT.

See also
History of the Australian Capital Territory
Territorial evolution of Australia

References

Further reading
National Archives of Australia - Jervis Bay Territory Acceptance Act 1915
Jervis Bay Territory Acceptance Act 1915 (NO. 19, 1915) (as passed)
JERVIS BAY TERRITORY ACCEPTANCE ACT 1915 (consolidated version, incorporating subsequent amendments)

Acts of the Parliament of Australia
History of the Australian Capital Territory
1915 in Australian law
Jervis Bay Territory
20th century in the Australian Capital Territory